Andre Eason (born December 19, 1975, in Brooklyn, New York) is a professional boxer.  He appeared on the reality show, Contender Season 2, where he lost to Walter Wright.

Prior to appearing on The Contender, Eason, known as "Daredevil", had come up short in each of his high-profile opportunities; losses to Juan Urango, Francisco Bojado, and Demetrius Hopkins.

Notes

External links
 

Boxers from New York City
1975 births
Living people
Welterweight boxers
Sportspeople from Brooklyn
The Contender (TV series) participants
American male boxers